Jakin may refer to:

 JAKIN, an American electronic music producer and DJ
 Jakin, Georgia, a city in the state of Georgia (United States)
 Jakin (magazine), a Basque-language magazine
 Alo Jakin, an Estonian cyclist